Hand County is a county in the U.S. state of South Dakota. As of the 2020 census, the population was 3,145. Its county seat is Miller.

History
Hand County was named for George A. Hand, territorial secretary. It was created in 1873 by the Dakota territorial legislature.  The boundaries were finalized in 1882, the year it was organized.

Geography
The terrain of Hand County consists of rolling hills, dotted with infrequent ponds and small lakes. Most of the area is devoted to agriculture. The terrain slopes to the east and northeast; its highest point is on the lower part of the county's west boundary line, at 2,080' (634m) ASL.

Major highways

 U.S. Highway 14
 U.S. Highway 212
 South Dakota Highway 26
 South Dakota Highway 45

Adjacent counties

 Faulk County - north
 Spink County - northeast
 Beadle County - east
 Jerauld County - southeast
 Buffalo County - southwest
 Hyde County - west

Protected areas
 Collins State Game Production Area
 Dakota State Game Production Area
 East Pearl State Game Production Area
 Hawkins State Game Production Area
 Lake Jones State Game Production Area
 Lake Louise State Game Production Area
 Lake Louise State Recreation Area
 Lechtenberg State Game Production Area
 Reinhardt State Game Production Area
 Rosehill State Game Production Area
 Spring Lake State Game Production Area
 West Pearl State Game Production Area

Lakes

 Costigan Slough Lake
 Jones Lake
 Lake Louise
 Matter Lake
 Spring Lake
 Wall Lake

Demographics

2000 census
As of the 2000 United States Census, there were 3,741 people, 1,543 households, and 1,050 families in the county. The population density was 3 people per square mile (1/km2). There were 1,840 housing units at an average density of 1.3 per square mile (0.5/km2). The racial makeup of the county was 99.30% White, 0.03% Black or African American, 0.13% Native American, 0.08% Asian, 0.13% from other races, and 0.32% from two or more races. 0.29% of the population were Hispanic or Latino of any race.

There were 1,543 households, out of which 28.10% had children under the age of 18 living with them, 60.90% were married couples living together, 4.40% had a female householder with no husband present, and 31.90% were non-families. 30.20% of all households were made up of individuals, and 17.40% had someone living alone who was 65 years of age or older. The average household size was 2.38 and the average family size was 2.97.

The county population contained 24.60% under the age of 18, 5.10% from 18 to 24, 22.30% from 25 to 44, 23.80% from 45 to 64, and 24.20% who were 65 years of age or older. The median age was 44 years. For every 100 females there were 96.20 males. For every 100 females age 18 and over, there were 92.90 males.

The median income for a household in the county was $32,377, and the median income for a family was $38,017. Males had a median income of $26,335 versus $16,181 for females. The per capita income for the county was $18,735. About 6.10% of families and 9.20% of the population were below the poverty line, including 8.90% of those under age 18 and 10.50% of those age 65 or over.

2010 census
As of the 2010 United States Census, there were 3,431 people, 1,494 households, and 972 families residing in the county. The racial makeup of the county was 98.4% white, 0.3% Asian, 0.2% American Indian, 0.1% black or African American, 0.2% from other races, and 0.8% from two or more races. Those of Hispanic or Latino origin made up 0.6% of the population. In terms of ancestry, 57.3% were German, 15.3% were Irish, 9.0% were Norwegian, 8.1% were English, 6.1% were Dutch, and 3.4% were American.

Of the 1,494 households, 23.8% had children under the age of 18 living with them, 56.6% were married couples living together, 5.3% had a female householder with no husband present, 34.9% were non-families, and 32.2% of all households were made up of individuals. The average household size was 2.26 and the average family size was 2.84. The median age was 48.2 years.

The median income for a household in the county was $45,895 and the median income for a family was $52,407. Males had a median income of $40,725 versus $24,844 for females. The per capita income for the county was $23,238. About 11.4% of families and 13.1% of the population were below the poverty line, including 18.9% of those under age 18 and 16.5% of those age 65 or over.

Communities

Cities

 Miller (county seat)
 Wessington (partial)

Towns 

 Ree Heights
 St. Lawrence

Census-designated place 

 Millerdale Colony

Unincorporated communities
 Polo
 Vayland

Townships

Alden
Alpha
Bates
Burdette
Campbell
Carlton
Cedar
Como
Florence
Gilbert
Glendale
Grand
Greenleaf
Hiland
Holden
Hulbert
Linn
Logan
Midland
Miller
Mondamin
Ohio
Ontario
Park
Pearl
Plato
Pleasant Valley
Ree Heights
Riverside
Rockdale
Rose Hill
St. Lawrence
Spring Hill
Spring Lake
Wheaton
York

Unorganized territory
The county contains one area of unorganized territory: Northwest Hand.

Politics
Hand County voters have voted Republican for many decades. In only one national election since 1936 has the county selected the Democratic Party candidate. As shown in the table below, Hand County has voted the same way as South Dakota for more than a century, last voting for a candidate who lost South Dakota in 1916, when Hand County voted Democratic but South Dakota went Republican.

See also
 National Register of Historic Places listings in Hand County, South Dakota
 Titan Wind Project

References

External links

 

 
1873 establishments in Dakota Territory
Populated places established in 1873